The Winnipeg Jets are a professional ice hockey team based in Winnipeg. They are members of the Central Division of the Western Conference of the National Hockey League (NHL). The team, owned by True North Sports & Entertainment, plays its home games at the Canada Life Centre.

The franchise was founded in 1999, and played eleven seasons in Atlanta, Georgia as the Atlanta Thrashers before moving to Winnipeg in 2011. The team has played eleven seasons in Winnipeg. After relocation the team struggled to make the playoffs as they qualified for the playoffs just once (in 2015) in their first six seasons. In the franchise's time in Winnipeg they have qualified for the playoffs six times and have advanced to one Conference Final in 2018.

Table key

Season-by-season

Notes
The season was shortened to 48 games because of the 2012–13 NHL lockout.
The NHL realigned prior to the 2013–14 season. The Jets were placed in the Central Division of the Western Conference.
The 2019–20 NHL season was suspended on March 12, 2020 because of the COVID-19 pandemic. The league resumed play on August 1, 2020 for the playoffs with the top 24 teams qualifying. 
Due to the COVID-19 pandemic, the 2020–21 NHL season was shortened to 56 games.

References

External links 
 Winnipeg Jets official website

 
seasons
Winnipeg Jets